Full Communism is the debut album by American punk rock band Downtown Boys, released on Don Giovanni Records in 2015.

Track listing
 "Wave of History"
 "Santa"
 "100% Inheritance Tax"
 "Tall Boys"
 "Break a Few Eggs"
 "Monstro"
 "Desde Arriba"
 "Future Police"
 "Traders"
 "Poder Elegir" (Los Prisioneros cover)

References

Downtown Boys (band) albums
Don Giovanni Records albums
2015 debut albums